Émile Nau (26 February 1812 - 27 February 1860) was a Haitian historian and politician. Born in Port-au-Prince, Nau's most famous work is Histoire des Caciques d'Haïti, a history of the "Caciques", or tribal chiefs of native inhabitants (Taïnos), of Haiti. Nau was the co-editor of two important magazines, Le Républicain and L'Union, which were published by his brother Ignace Nau. Emile and the Ardouin brothers, Beaubrun, Céligny, and Coriolan, were members of the literary society "The School of 1836" founded by his brother Ignace. Emile Nau also served as Delegate of Port-au-Prince during the Presidency of Jean-Pierre Boyer.

References
 
 

1812 births
1860 deaths
19th-century Haitian historians
Haitian male writers
Haitian politicians
People from Port-au-Prince
19th-century male writers